Qanat-e Bid (also Romanized as Qanāt-e Bīd; also known as Qanāt-e Būd) is a village in Gevar Rural District, Sarduiyeh District, Jiroft County, Kerman Province, Iran. At the 2006 census, its population was 53, in 12 families.

References 

Populated places in Jiroft County